Professor Minesh P. Mehta, MD, FASTRO, is an American radiation oncologist and physician-scientist of Indian origin, Ugandan birth, Zambian Schooling and American Training, who contributed to the field of oncology for more than two and half decades.

Early life 
Born Minesh Prafulchandra Mehta in Uganda, December 14, 1957, to two teachers from India.  After moving to Zambia, he completed high school, and enrolled in the pre-medical curriculum, graduating with a Bachelor's degree in Human Biology from the University of Zambia. He completed a residency at the University of Wisconsin, where he served as chief resident in radiation oncology.

Career
Mehta is currently deputy director and chief of radiation oncology at Miami Cancer Institute at Baptist Health South Florida. Until January 2016, he served as medical director of the Maryland Proton Treatment Center at University of Maryland School of Medicine in Baltimore launching, the area’s first proton treatment center. Prior to this till 2013 at Robert H. Lurie Comprehensive Cancer Center of Northwestern University in Chicago, he was co-director of the Radiation Oncology Residency Training Program, mentoring many young physicians who have gone on to become prominent leaders in the field. He has designed and led numerous national and international clinical studies, receiving NIH and NCI grants and winning several honors, many for his research in brain and central nervous system tumors.

In 1988, after completing his residency training at the University of Wisconsin, he joined the Department of Human Oncology, University of Wisconsin School of Medicine and Public Health, Madison as an assistant professor, eventually becoming tenured Professor and Department Chair  by 1997.

Among his many accomplishments were the scientific and clinical implementation of image-guided intensity modulated radiotherapy through an NIH-funded Program Project Grant, overseeing the development of robust translational programs combining radiotherapy with targeted agents integrating advanced imaging (he was the Principal Investigator for the Imaging and Radiation Sciences Program of the University of Wisconsin Cancer Center for 15 years), and providing national and international leadership in Brain Tumor Clinical Trials through his leadership of the Brain Tumor Committee of the Radiation Therapy Oncology Group (RTOG). The RTOG Brain Tumor Committee arguably became the most comprehensive clinical trial co-operative group committee for this disease category, completing the largest ever randomized trial in Glioblastoma, incorporating patient-specific, advanced-imaging, molecular, and cognitive/quality-of-life endpoints.

Additionally, through his work in the RTOG and other clinical trial mechanisms he was instrumental in setting new standards in clinical research on Brain Metastases through a series of well-conducted multicenter, international, randomized trials, incorporating both traditional and novel endpoints, resulting in the most robust neurologic and neurocognitive dataset collection and evaluation for this condition.

He developed an extensive statewide network of radiotherapy centers allied to the University, in order to robustly extend the reach of clinical research through the entire state.  He also mentored the development and successful completion and re-funding of a major NIH award focusing on Cancer Disparities in Underserved Populations, and this became the benchmark for successful survey, epidemiologic, interventional, and translational research in this field.  
He groomed several residents and faculty who went on to major leadership and research positions, and after 10 years as Chairman. In 2007 he dedicated his efforts to further his interests in Brain and Thoracic Tumor Clinical Trials interests, as well as committing significant time to resident, national, and international education. In 2010 he resigned from his position at the University of Wisconsin, after a potential conflict of interest investigation began into his consultancy work for TomoTherapy Inc.

Medical education 
He completed Medical School at the University of Zambia in 1981. After completing his internship and a year of residency training, he enrolled in the Radiation Oncology Residency Program at the University of Wisconsin-Madison, which he completed in 1988.

Scientific career 
His scientific career in neuro- and thoracic oncology started in 1988 and was marked by a zealous focus on evidence-based medicine through clinical and translational research, including a variety of areas such as endobronchial brachytherapy, radioimmunotherapy, stereotactic radiosurgery, fractionated stereotactic radiotherapy, image-guided and intensity-modulated radiotherapy, radioprotectors, radiosensitizers, altered fractionation, combination chemoradiotherapy as well as combining targeted agents with radiotherapy.

Publications 
Minesh Mehta has provided leadership for over 100 clinical protocols, authored almost 100 book chapters and published more than 800 scientific papers and abstracts.  He has been a sought after national and international speaker, having delivered over 600 presentations.

Roles in scientific arena

Administrative positions 

He has held numerous administrative positions at the University of Wisconsin-Madison, School of Medicine and Public Health, Human Oncology including Professor, Assistant Professor, Associate Professor, Director of Residency Program, Vice-Chairman and Chairman for a decade.  He received Eric Wolfe Professorship in 2007 and was recognized as a fellow of ASTRO (FASTRO)in 2009.

Teaching interests 
For almost a decade he taught the neoplastic diseases course at the University of Wisconsin School of Medicine, Madison.  He groomed over 100 residents, fellows and faculty. He was named as one of the best teachers in radiation oncology in 2009.

Expertise and research interests 
His focus is primarily in the areas of intensity modulated radiotherapy, incorporating advanced imaging in radiotherapy treatment planning, CNS malignancies, lung cancer, pediatric neoplasms, stereotactic radiosurgery, radiosensitization, combined modality therapies, altered fractionation, cost-effectiveness, and outcomes research.

He has run numerous multimodality clinical trials at the national level for both adult and pediatric CNS neoplasms. Current major thrust areas include developing molecularly-targeted agents as radiosensitizers for thoracic and CNS tumors.

Together with Thomas Rockwell Mackie, Mehta developed a form of radiation treatment known as Tomotherapy.

Advisory boards and consulting roles 
Dr. Mehta has served on over two dozen national and corporate advisory boards, including associations with several innovative start-ups, both in the biotech and medical physics arenas, allowing rapid clinical testing of life-changing oncology devices and drugs.

Areas of expertise
 Radiosensitizers: using classic, chemotherapy drugs and targeted agents to increase sensitivity for cancer treatment, with a focus on clinical trials.
 Radioprotectors: using classic and new drugs as well as molecularly targeted agents in radioprotection clinical trials for radiotherapy-induced toxicities.
 Innovations in radiation treatment: developing and incorporating technologies such as 3-D planning, IMRT (helical tomotherapy), radiosurgery, and incorporating novel imaging in treatment planning, monitoring, and delivery.
 Combined modality treatment of tumors of the CNS and thorax, as well as pediatric neoplasms: integrating systemic chemotherapy and novel agents, including personalized medicine approaches.
 Effects of therapies on cognition and developing methods to improve neurocognitive function.

Notable achievements 
 Medical director, the Maryland Proton Treatment Center.
 Associate Director of clinical research in the Department of Radiation Oncology, University of Maryland Marlene and Stewart Greenebaum Cancer Center.
 Chair, Brain Tumor Committee, Radiation Therapy Oncology Group.

Personal life
Dr. Mehta's son, Tej Mehta, is currently a Captain in the United States Air Force and a physician completing residency in Vascular and Interventional Radiology at The Johns Hopkins Hospital.

References

1957 births
Living people
Indian emigrants to the United States
American oncologists
American people of Indian descent in health professions
University of Maryland, Baltimore faculty